The following is a list of notable deaths in February 2003.

Entries for each day are listed alphabetically by surname. A typical entry lists information in the following sequence:
 Name, age, country of citizenship at birth, subsequent country of citizenship (if applicable), reason for notability, cause of death (if known), and reference.

February 2003

1
Anne Burr, 84, American actress (Native Son, The Hasty Heart, As the World Turns).
Adalberto Ortiz, 88, Ecuadorian writer.
Mongo Santamaría, 85, Cuban Latin jazz percussionist.
Nancy Whiskey, 67, Scottish folk singer ("Freight Train").
Crew of STS-107 killed in the Space Shuttle Columbia disaster:
Michael P. Anderson, 43, American, payload commander.
David M. Brown, 46, American, mission specialist.
Kalpana Chawla, 40, American, mission specialist.
Laurel Clark, 41, American, mission specialist.
Rick Husband, 45, American, commander.
William C. McCool, 41, American, pilot.
Ilan Ramon, 48, Israeli, payload specialist.

2
Vincent "Randy" Chin, 65, Jamaican record producer.
Lou Harrison, 85, American composer, noted for his microtonal works.
Ronald Lawrence Hughes, 82, infantry officer in the Australian Army.
Jack Lauterwasser, 98, English racing cyclist and cycling engineer, fall at home.
Richard C. Lee, 86, American politician, Mayor of New Haven, Connecticut.
Won Kuk Lee, 95, Korean martial artist, pneumonia.
David C. Rowe, 53, American psychology professor.
Marcello Truzzi, 67, American professor of sociology, cancer.
Emerson Woelffer, 88, American abstract expressionist artist and teacher.

3
Natascha Artin Brunswick, 93, German-American mathematician and economist.
Lana Clarkson, 40, American actress (Fast Times at Ridgemont High, Scarface, Barbarian Queen), shot by record producer Phil Spector.
Shadito Cruz, 88, Mexican professional wrestler, Alzheimer's disease.
Trevor Morris, 82, Welsh footballer and World War II pilot.
Peter Schat, 67, Dutch composer.

4
Charles McLaren, 3rd Baron Aberconway, 89, British industrialist and horticulturalist.
Benyoucef Benkhedda, 82, Algerian politician, head of Provisional Government of the Algerian Republic (1961–1962).
Charlie Biddle, 76, American-Canadian jazz bassist, played with Thelonious Monk and Charlie Parker.
John Biolo, 86, American professional football player (Lake Forest College, Green Bay Packers).
Jean Brossel, 84, French physicist, a key figure in the development of modern atomic physics and quantum optics.
Jerome Hines, 81, American operatic bass.
Jim Mertz, 86, American baseball player (Washington Senators).
Qalandar Momand, 72, Pakistani poet and writer.
Jim North, 83, American professional football player (Washington Redskins).
André Noyelle, 71, Belgian road racing cyclist (1952 Olympic gold medals: individual road race, team road race).
Dick Shatto, 89, Canadian football player.

5
Helge Boes, 32, American CIA operations officer, accident during live-fire training in Afghanistan.
Manfred von Brauchitsch, 97, German auto racing driver, winner of three Grand Prix races in the 1930s.
Guillermo González Calderoni, 54, Mexican Federal Judicial Police official (portrayed in 2018 Netflix drama, Narcos: Mexico).
Micky Fenton, 89, England  football player.
Larry LeSueur, 93, American journalist, Parkinson's disease.
Dale Roberts, 46, British football player, cancer.
Werner Romberg, 93, German mathematician and physicist.
Robert D. Schuck, 85, American politician.
Joseph P. Vigorito, 84, American politician (U.S. Representative for Pennsylvania's 24th congressional district).

6
Eric Ashby, 85, English naturalist and wildlife cameraman.
José Craveirinha, 80, Mozambican journalist, story writer and poet.
Arthur Doherty, 71, Irish politician.
Mark Freeman, 94, Austrian-born American visual artist.
Robert St. John, 100, American author, broadcaster, and journalist.
Sir Peter Saunders, 91, British theatre impresario.
Landrum Shettles, 93, American biologist and a pioneer in the field of vitro fertilization.
Alex Stokes, 83, British physicist.

7
Noriko Sawada Bridges Flynn, 79, American writer and civil rights activist.
Edward Knapp-Fisher, 88, Anglican bishop and scholar.
Augusto Monterroso, 81, Honduran writer, heart failure.
Amalia Nieto, 95, Uruguayan painter, engraver and sculptor.
John Reading, 85, American Mayor of Oakland, California from 1966 to 1977.
Malcolm Roberts, 58, English pop singer,  heart attack .
Leader Stirling, 97, English missionary surgeon and Health Minister in Tanzania.
Stephen Whittaker, 55, British actor and director (Nicholas Nickleby, Sons and Lovers).

8
Hank Blade, 82, Canadian professional ice hockey player (Chicago Blackhawks).
William Louis Culberson, 73, American lichenologist.
John Charles Cutler, 87, American surgeon.
Wally Scott, 78, American aviator and author, pneumonia.
Alice Treff, 96, German film actress.
Konrad Weichert, 68, German Olympic sailor (bronze medal in 1968 Dragon, silver medal in 1972 Dragon).
George A. Zentmyer, 89, American plant physiologist, one of the world's foremost authorities on Phytophthora.

9
Tanya Anacleto, 26, Mozambican freestyle swimmer (women's 50 metre freestyle at the 2000 Summer Olympics).
Herma Bauma, 88, Austrian javelin thrower (gold medal in women's javelin throw at the 1948 Summer Olympics).
Ruby Braff, 75, American jazz trumpeter and cornetist.
Sister Mary Ignatius Davies, 81, Sister of Mercy and inspirational music teacher, heart attack.
Masatoshi Gündüz Ikeda, 76, Turkish mathematician of Japanese ancestry.
H. Douglas Keith, 75, British physicist and polymer researcher.
Anthony Luteyn, 85, Dutch officer during World War II.
Ken McKinlay, 74, British speedway rider.
Billy Parker, 61, American baseball player (California Angels).
Vera Ralston, 82, Czech figure skater and actress, star of Ice Capades and "B" actress in the 1940s.
Russ Ramsay, 74, Canadian politician, Alzheimer's disease.

10
Chuck Aleno, 85, American baseball player (Cincinnati Reds).
Ralph Beard, 73, American baseball player (St. Louis Cardinals).
Edgar de Evia, 92, American photographer born in Mérida, Yucatán.
Curt Hennig, 44, professional wrestler.
Clark MacGregor, 80, former 5-term Republican United States Congressman from Minnesota (1961–1970).
Paul Randles, 37, American game designer.
Al Ruffo, 94, politician, philanthropist, educator, lawyer, and football coach and former mayor of San Jose, California.
Jan Veselý, 79, Czechoslovakian cyclist (men's individual road race, men's team road race at the 1952 Summer Olympics).
Carmen Vidal, 87, Spanish cosmetologist and businesswoman.
Ron Ziegler, 63, former press secretary for Richard Nixon during the Watergate Scandal.

11
Socorro Avelar, 77, Mexican actress, stomach cancer.
Arndt Bause, 66, German composer, pulmonary embolism.
Michael Breheny, 54, English town planner, professor of planning at Reading University.
Neville Colman, 57, South African-American hematologist and forensic DNA expert, gastric cancer.
Michel Graillier, 56, French jazz pianist.
Marc Iliffe, 30, British strongman, suffocation.
Fern Shumate, 92, American writer of stories and news articles.
Luke Chia-Liu Yuan, 90, Chinese-American physicist and grandson of Yuan Shikai.

12
Wally Burnette, 73, American baseball player (Kansas City Athletics).
Richard Edwin Fox, 47, American criminal, execution by lethal injection.
Frederick Higginson, 89, British World War II fighter pilot.
Vali Myers, 72, Australian artist.
Sir Brian Stanbridge, 78, British air marshal.
Haywood Sullivan, 72, American baseball player (Boston Red Sox, Kansas City Athletics), manager (Kansas City Athletics) and owner (Boston Red Sox).
Dick Whitman, 82, American baseball player (Brooklyn Dodgers, Philadelphia Phillies).
Kemmons Wilson, 90, American businessman, founder of Holiday Inn.

13
James Thomas Flexner, 95, American historian and biographer.
Kid Gavilán, 77, world boxing champion and hall of famer.
Robert Ivers, 68, American actor.
Axel Jensen, 71, Norwegian author, ALS.
Stacy Keach, Sr., 88, actor (Pretty Woman, Teen Wolf, The Parallax View).
Stuart Keith, 71, British-born American ornithologist.
Leonor Llausás, 73, Mexican actress.
Walt Rostow, 86, American political advisor.

14
Dolly, 6, the world's first cloned mammal, euthanization following a lung disease.
Joseph Peter Kinneary, 97, American district judge.
Johnny Longden, 96, American jockey.
Paul E. Meehl, 83, American clinical psychologist.
Sundaram Ramakrishnan, 80, Indian freedom fighter and social activist, heart attack.
Sir John Smith, 81, British legal scholar.

15
Aldo Albera, 80, Italian sprint canoer (men's 10000 metres K-1 single-man sprint kayak at the 1952 Summer Olympics).
Vincent Apap, 93, Maltese sculptor.
Alexander Bennett, 73, British ballet dancer, teacher and ballet master, principal dancer with the Royal Ballet.
Vlastimil Koubek, 75, Czech American architect, cancer.
Ted Kress, 71, American football player and businessman.
Aleksandar Tišma, 79, Serbian novelist.
Richard Wilberforce, Baron Wilberforce, 95, British judge.

16
Philip John Gardner, 88, British recipient of the Victoria Cross.
Jim Gordon, 76, American television and radio newscaster, cancer.
Eileen Letchworth, 80, American actress.
Rusty Magee, 47, American composer of musicals.
Frances Freeborn Pauley, 97, American civil rights activist.

17
Steve Bechler, 23, American baseball player (Baltimore Orioles).
Julian Bigelow, 89, American computer engineer, built one of the first digital computers (IAS machine).
Allen Britton, 88, American music educator, contributed to the history of music pedagogy (Journal of Research in Music Education).
Donald James Porter, 81, American judge (U.S. District Judge of the U.S. District Court for the District of South Dakota).
Frank Thistlethwaite, 87, British academic, first Vice-Chancellor of the University of East Anglia.
Harry Warner Jr., 80, American journalist.

18
Tony Altomare, 74, American professional wrestler and trainer.
Quentin Anderson, 90, American literary critic and cultural historian (Henry James, Ralph Waldo Emerson, Walt Whitman).
Ittla Frodi, 72, Swedish actress, writer and producer.
Len Garrison, 59, British educationalist and historian.
Isser Harel, 90/91, Israeli spymaster and director of the Mossad.
Keith Ross, 75, British consultant cardiac surgeon, aneurysm.

19
Dan Anderson, 81, American clinical psychologist and educator, president of the Hazelden Foundation.
Washington Beltrán, 88, Uruguayan politician, President (1965–1966).
James Hardy, 84, American pioneer surgeon.
Johnny Paycheck, 64, American country music singer.
Josef Wüst, 77, Austrian journalist, editor-in-chief and publisher.

20
Maurice Blanchot, 95, French writer, philosopher and literary theorist.
Orville Freeman, 84, American politician.
Ty Longley, 31, American guitarist for the heavy metal band Great White; victim of the Station nightclub fire.
Harry Jacunski, 87, American NFL player, Green Bay Packers.
Orville Lothrop Freeman, 84, American Governor of Minnesota and Secretary of Agriculture for Presidents John F. Kennedy and Lyndon B. Johnson.
Mushaf Ali Mir, 55, Pakistan Chief of the Air Staff, air crash.
Frederick Thomas, 85, Scottish cricketer.

21
Barry Bucknell, 91, English BBC television presenter who popularized Do It Yourself (DIY).
Edwin Bustillos, 38, Mexican human rights activist and environmentalist.
Jim Courtright, 88, Canadian track and field athlete.
Eddie Dodson, 54, American criminal and socialite, complications from  Hepatitis C.
John E. Fryer, 65, American psychiatrist and gay rights activist.
Tom Glazer, 88, American folk singer and songwriter.
Fei Hsi-ping, Taiwanese politician, heart failure.
Karel Kosík, 76, Czech Marxist philosopher.
Rusty Peters, 88, American baseball player (Philadelphia Athletics, Cleveland Indians, St. Louis Browns).
Galeazzo Ruspoli, 80, Italian nobleman.
Eddie Thomson, 55, Scottish football player and coach.

22
Sir Frank Callaway, 83, Australian music educator and administrator.
Jilani Kamran, 76, Pakistani poet, critic, and teacher, brain haemorrhage.
Jean-Pierre Miquel, 66, French actor and theatre director.
Jesica Santillan, 17, Mexican heart and lung patient whose wrong transplant made headlines.
Daniel Taradash, 90, American former president of AMPAS; Oscar-winning screenwriter of "From Here to Eternity", pancreatic cancer.

23
Shlomo Argov, 73, Israeli diplomat, Ambassador of Israel to the United Kingdom.
Howie Epstein, 47, American former bass player for Tom Petty and the Heartbreakers.
Helle-Reet Helenurm, 59, Estonian actress.
Christopher Hill, 91, British historian.
Robert K. Merton, 92, American sociologist.
Sir Bernard Miller, 98, British businessman, chairman of John Lewis Partnership.
Titos Vandis, 85, Greek actor (The Exorcist, Baretta, The A-Team, M*A*S*H, Kojak, Newhart).

24
Alex Cameron, 65, American English professor and official pronouncer of the Scripps National Spelling Bee from 1981 to 2002.
Albert Hibbs, 78, American mathematician and physicist known as "The Voice of JPL".
Bernard Loiseau, 52, French chef, suicide by gunshot.
Walter Scharf, 92, American film composer, heart failure.

John Shaw, 78, Australian opera singer.
Alberto Sordi, 82, Italian comedy actor.
Antoni Torres, 59, Spanish footballer, cancer.

25
Kate Atkinson Bell, 95, American educator.
Alexander Kemurdzhian, 81, Armenian scientist.
Lee Mun-ku, 61, South Korean novelist.
Tom O'Higgins, 86, Irish Fine Gael politician, barrister and judge.

26
Harold Amos, 84, American microbiologist and professor, chairman of Harvard Medical School bacteriology department.
Brian Evans, 60, Welsh football player, cancer.
Earl Forest, 76, American musician, cancer.
Christian Goethals, 74, Belgian racing driver.
Jaime Ramírez, 71, Chilean football player.

27
Doris Grant, 98, British nutritionist and food writer.
John Lanchbery, 79, British-born Australian musician.
James D. Nichols, 74, American horse racing jockey, rode in seven U.S. Triple Crown races.
Fred Rogers, 74, American television personality, host of Mister Rogers' Neighborhood.
Scotty, 52/53, Jamaican reggae vocalist, prostate cancer.

28
Alfred Bernstein, 92, American civil rights, civil liberties and union activist.
Göte Blomqvist, 75, Swedish ice hockey player (bronze medal in ice hockey at the 1952 Winter Olympics).
Chris Brasher, 74, British track and field athlete (gold medal in men's 3000m steeplechase at the 1956 Summer Olympics).
Dinos Dimopoulos, 81, Greek film director.
Jim Fridley, 78, American baseball player (Cleveland Indians, Baltimore Orioles, Cincinnati Redlegs).
Fidel Sánchez Hernández, 85, former President of El Salvador, heart attack.

References 

2003-02
 02